The Niagarakely are waterfalls of the Sandrangato river that are situated near Anosibe An'ala, Alaotra-Mangoro Region, Madagascar.
It is located at 72 km from Moramanga.

References

Waterfalls of Madagascar

 Alaotra-Mangoro